Problepsis latonaria is a moth of the  family Geometridae. It is found in Malawi and South Africa.

References

Moths described in 1858
Scopulini
Moths of Africa